Sudre may refer to:

Surname
 François Sudre (1787–1862), French violinist, composer and music teacher who invented a musical language called la Langue musicale universelle, or Solrésol
 François Sudre (1844–1912), inventor of the sudrophone
 Henri L. Sudre (1862–1918), French botanist
 Jean-Pierre Sudre (1921–1997), French commercial photographer
 Margie Sudre (born 1943), Vietnam-born French politician
 Raymond Sudre (1870–1962), French sculptor

Other
 Sedreh, a garment worn by Zoroastrians